Indian names are based on a variety of systems and naming conventions, which vary from region to region. Names are also influenced by religion and caste and may come from epics. India's population speaks a wide variety of languages and nearly every major religion in the world has a following in India. This variety makes for subtle, often confusing, differences in names and naming styles. Due to historical Indian cultural influences, several names across South and Southeast Asia are influenced by or adapted from Indian names or words.

In some cases, Indian birth name is different from their official name; the birth name starts with a randomly selected name from the person's horoscope (based on the nakshatra or lunar mansion corresponding to the person's birth).

Many children are given three names, sometimes as a part of religious teaching.

Pronunciation

When written in Latin script, Indian names may use the vowel characters to denote sounds different from conventional American or British English. Although some languages, like Kannada or Tamil may have different vowel sounds, the ones used in most major Indian languages are represented in this table along with typical English transcriptions.

Furthermore, the letters used in English /t/ and /d/ that are used to represent the retroflex stops /ʈ/ and /ɖ/, are also used to represent dental stops /t̪/ and /d̪/ (as in Tenginkai or Rohit), especially when they occur in the onset of a word. As an example, the Indian name 'Dev' would not have its first consonant pronounced as in the American name 'Dave'. Similarly the name 'Tarun' would not have its first consonant sounded as in 'Tom'.

The letter 'h' is used to represent aspirated consonants. So, in the names 'Khare', 'Ghanshyam', 'Kaccha', 'Jhumki', 'Vitthal', 'Ranchodh', 'Uddhav', 'Phaneesh', and 'Bhanu,' the 'h' means the sound before it should be pronounced with a strong outward breath (see Aspirated consonant for more on this). These names are more likely to be found in places that speak an Indo-Aryan language like Bhojpuri or Gujarati.

Names by culture

Assamese 
Assamese names follow the First name-Middle name-Surname or First name-Surname pattern.

Bengali
Bengali names follow First name-Middle name-Surname pattern, as seen with Subhas Chandra Bose.

Bengali Brahmin surnames include Acharya, Banerjee, Bagchi, Bhaduri, Bhattacharjee, Chakraborty, Chatterjee, Ganguly, Goswami, Ghoshal, Lahiri, Maitra, Mukherjee, Sanyal, etc. A Brahmin name is often the name of the clan or gotra, but can be an honorific, such as Chakraborty or Bhattacharya.

Common Baidya surnames are Sengupta, Dasgupta, Duttagupta, Gupta, Das-Sharma, and Sen-Sharma.

Bengali Kayastha surnames include Basu, Bose, Dutta, Ghosh, Choudhury, Guha, Mitra, Singh/Sinha, Pal, De/Dey/Deb/Dev, Palit, Chanda/Chandra, Das, Dam, Kar, Nandi, Nag, Som etc.

Odia
Odia names follow the First name-Middle name-Surname or First name-Surname pattern.

Odia surnames come from caste based on human occupation. For example, the common surnames Kar, Mohapatra, and Dash (as opposed to Das) are Brahmin surnames. Similarly, Misra/Mishra, Nanda, Rath, Shatapathi, Panigrahi, and Tripathi are all Brahmin surnames. Das and Sahu are Karan, others are Samant Singh, Sundaraya, Jagdev, Baliarsingh, Harichandan, Manraj, Mardraj, Senapati, Srichandan, Pratihari, Chhotray, Patasani, Parida, Samal, Nayak, and Muduli.

Goan 
Konkani people inhabiting Goa, and also Konkan regions of Karnataka and Maharashtra, use First name - Middle name - Village name/Surname pattern. Generally, the first name is followed by the father's name, though this is now mostly observed by Hindus, who are traditionally patriarchal.

Village names were used only after the arrival of the Portuguese, when the people migrated from their ancestral villages. A suffix kar or hailing from was attached to the village name.

Many of the originally Hindu residents were converted to Catholicism by the Portuguese. Almost all of the Konkani Catholics have Portuguese surnames like Rodrigues, Fernandes, Pereira and D'Souza. Catholic families belonging to the Roman Catholic Brahmin (Bamonn) caste use lusophonised versions of Hindu surnames like Prabhu, Bhat, etc.

Gujarati 
Gujarati  names follow a  pattern of Last name - First name - Father's first name. The last name is commonly a caste name. For example: Modi Narendra Damodardas - Narendra is his first name, Damodardas is his father's name and Modi is his last name, which is the same as that used by his ancestors. Upon marriage, the wife takes on the husband's first and last names as middle and last names respectively. For example, if Jessica Amber Smith married Vadgama Sanjay Bharat her name would become Jessica Vadgama Bharat.

Northern 
Northern naming cutoms follow a standard pattern of First name - Middle name - Surname. Many times the middle name will be appended onto the first name, or not exist at all. Sometimes middle name would even be father's first name. The surname is most commonly a caste name however, there are some caste-neutral surnames like Kumar. For example: Manohar Lal Khattar (Manohar is his first name, Lal is a middle name, and Khattar is a caste surname). Many women, especially in rural areas, take on the surname Devi (meaning Goddess) or Kumari (princess) when they are married (ex. Phoolan Devi, known as Phoolan Mallah before marriage). Muslims in North India use Islamic naming conventions.

Kannada
Kannada names vary by region as follows.

North Karnataka follows the First name - Father's first name - Surname order. This system is also found in other parts of Karnataka.

Surnames are drawn from the names of places, food items, dresses, temples, type of people, platforms, cities,  professions, and so on. Surnames are drawn from many other sources.

Katti as a suffix is used for soldiers while Karadis is related to local folk art. Surnames according to trade or what they traditionally farm include Vastrad (piece of cloth), Kubasad (blouse), Menasinkai (chili), Ullagaddi (onion), Limbekai, Ballolli (garlic), Tenginkai (coconut), Byali (pulse), and Akki (rice). Surnames based on house include Doddamani (big house), Hadimani (house next to the road), Kattimani (house with a platform in its front), Bevinmarad (person having a big neem tree near his house), and Hunasimarad (person having a big tamarind tree near his house). A carpenter will have Badigar as a surname, while Mirjankar, Belagavi, Hublikar, and Jamkhandi are surnames drawn from places. Angadi (shop), Amavasya (new moon day), Kage (crow), Bandi (bullock cart), Kuri (sheep), Kudari (horse), Toppige (cap), Beegadkai (key), Pyati (market), Hanagi (comb), and Rotti (bread) are some other surnames.

In coastal Karnataka, the surnames are different in different regions. Surnames like Hegde and Hebbar belong to the Brahmin community, while other titles like Ballal, Shetty, and Rai are mostly used by the landed Bunt community. Names in coastal Karnataka have both systems Village name - Father's name - Personal name - Surname and Personal name - Father's name - Surname. 

Names in South Karnataka follow Village name - Father's name - Personal name - Surname. For example, take H. D. Kumaraswamy. H refers to Haradanahalli (his native village), D refers to Devegowda (his father's name), and his first name is Kumaraswamy. Another example is B A Narasimharaju, where B refers to Belur (his native town), A refers to Anantharama Iyengar (his father's name), and his first name Narasimharaju. For married women, it is Husband's name - First name or the opposite (ex. Sumalatha Ambareesh, where Ambareesh is her husband's name). In South Karnataka, caste names are not common except among the higher castes. Kannada Brahmins have surnames like Rao, Murthy, Poojari, and Bhat. The title Gowda was a title given to any village headman, irrespective of caste, and was written as an appendage to the person's name. For example Siddaramaiah's father belonged to the Kuruba community but was called Siddarame Gowda. Nowadays it is mostly used as a Vokkaliga surname. Most people in South Karnataka, regardless of caste, do not use caste surnames.

Kashmiri
Kashmiri names often follow the naming convention First name - Middle name (optional) - Family name. (For example: Jawahar Lal Nehru)

Nicknames often replace family names. Hence, some family names like Razdan and Nehru may very well be derived originally from the Kaul family tree.

Malayali 
Malayali surname includes Nair, Menon, Pillai, Nambootri, Panikkar, and Kurup. Malayalis follow similar naming customs to Tamils and people in South Karnataka, using Village name - Father's name - Personal name. Muslims also follow this system, though their first names follow the Islamic system.

Members of the Menon, Nair, and related communities often use their mother's house name or directly add their caste name. For example, Kannoth Karunakaran, Karunakaran is his given name and Kannoth is his mother's house name. P. K. Vasudevan Nair, Vasudevan is his given name and Nair is his caste surname. Most of the Malayalis write name as Given name - Father's name - Father's father's name/house name/village name - Suriname/caste title. For instance, Shreelakshmi Dhanapalan Sadhu Kunjpilla; where Shreelakshmi is first name, Dhanapalan is middle name/father's name, Sadhu is grandfather's name, and Kujnpilla is surname/caste title. It might also be written as Shreelakshmi Dhanapalan S K.   

Earlier times (until the 20th Century) Malayali Christians (Nasranis) were bound by only Christian names and usually used the Family/house name – Father’s name – Baptismal name naming convention. Nowadays, however, Christians have various naming conventions such as Name - Surname - Father's Name or Name - Father's name or Name - Surname or Name - Father's Name - Grandfather's Name. It can be concluded that Syrian Christian names are Patryonmic. Eg:  Arackaparambil Kurien Antony, better known as A. K. Antony, who is an Indian politician and attorney and was the 23rd Defence Minister of India, here the policitcan's name is Antony while his father's name is Kurien, while his family name is Arackaparambil. During the 20th century some names were created by joining two or more syllables. For example, Abey (AB), Aji (AG), Bibi (BB), Biji (BG), Siby (CB) and so on. Today, several Syrian Christians name their children by Indian names like Deepak, Rahul, Neethu, Asha etc. But by the 21st century more biblical names began to reappear. Thus names like, Isaac, Joshua, David, Saul, Ezekiel, Timothy, appeared on the scene.   

 Marathi 
Marathi people of Hindu religion follow a partially patronymic naming system. For example, it is customary to associate the father's name with the given name. In the case of married women, the husband's name is associated with the given name. Therefore, the constituents of a Marathi name as given name/first name, father/husband name, family name/surname. For example:
 Mahadev Govind Ranade: Here Mahadev is the given name, Govind is his father's given name and Ranade is the surname.
Sunil Madhav Jadhav: Here Sunil is the given name, Madhav is his father's name and Jadhav is the surname.
 Jyotsna Mukund Khandekar: Here Jyotsna is the given name, Mukund is the husband's given name, and Khandekar is the surname of the husband

Personal names
Marathi Hindus choose given names for their children from a variety of sources. They could be characters from Hindu mythological epics such as the Ramayana or Mahabharat, names of holy rivers such as Yamuna and Godavari, Hindu historical characters from Maratha or Indian history such as Shivaji and Ashoka, Marathi varkari saints such as Tukaram, Dnyaneshwar, Janabai, popular characters from modern Marathi literature, names of fragrant flowers for girls (e.g. Bakul, Kamal/Kamla for lotus), senses such as Madhura for sweetness, precious metals such female name Suwarna for gold, heavenly bodies such as the Sun and the Moon, Vasant and Sharad for spring and autumn respectively, names of film stars (e.g. Amit after Amitabh Bachchan) or sportsmen, and after virtues (e.g.,Vinay for modesty). Nicknames such as Dada, Bandu, Balu, Sonya and Pillu for males and Chhabu and Bebi for girls have been popular too.

Surnames
A large number of Maharashtrian surnames are derived by adding the suffix kar to the village from which the family originally hailed. For example, Junnarkar came from town of Junnar, Waghulkar comes from the town of Waghul. Names like Kumbhar, Sutar, Kulkarni, Deshpande, Deshmukh, Patil, Pawar, Desai, and Joshi denote the family's ancestral trade or professions.

Families of the historical Maratha chiefs use their clan name as their surname. Some of these are Jadhav, Bhosale, Chavan, Shinde, Shirke, More, Nimbalkar, Pawar, and Ghatge. Members of the numerically largest Maratha Kunbi cultivator class among Marathi people have also adopted some of the Maratha clan names, whether to indicate allegiance to the Maratha chief they served, or as an attempt at upward mobility.

 Punjabi 

Sikh names often have the following format: First name - Religious name - Family name. The religious name is always Singh for males, for example "Ravinder Singh Sahota"; and Kaur for females, examples include "Harmanpreet Kaur Bhullar", "Harleen Kaur Deol", and "Manjeet Kaur Bhullar". Since Sikhism opposes castes, they do not traditionally use family names. Upon marriage, a Sikh woman will take the family name of the husband.Sardar for males and Sardarni for females are sometimes prefixed as titles. A lot of Sikh first names can be used by both sexes.

Tamil
Tamil names usually follow this pattern: Initial (Village name) - Initial (Father's name) - First name - Surname (Example: M.G. Ramachandran, where the M stands for Marudhur, and G stands for Gopalan, the father's name. Another example is R. Karthik, where R stands for Ravichandran, the father's name). There is a widespread usage of a patronym (use of the father's given name as the last name). This means that the first name of one generation becomes the last name of the next. In many cases, the father's given name appears as an initial and when written in full (for example, on a passport), the initial is expanded as last name. For example, a name like "R. Kumaresh"  will be written in full as "or "Kumaresh Ramaiah", and refers to "Kumaresh son of Ramaiah". If Kumaresh then has a son named Vijay, then his name would be "K. Vijay" or "Vijay Kumaresh " as it would be in the West. There is also a general custom for Tamil women, after marriage to adopt their husband's first name as their new initial or new last name instead of their father's. A woman named K. Anitha / Anitha Kumaresh  (Anitha daughter of Kumaresh) might change her name after marriage to S. Anitha / Anitha Saravanan (Anitha wife of Saravanan). However, these customs vary from family to family and are normally never carried on over successive generations.

Due to the influence of the Dravidian movement, from the 1930s, most Tamils abandoned their surnames, both in India and nations like Singapore, due to the arising consciousness that these surnames were synonymous with their caste identity, leading to social stigma. 

More common among women, making the patronym or husband name the last name is a custom adopted by people migrating to the West, who want to be called by their first names without having to explain Indian naming conventions. However, women frequently adopt their father's or husband's name, and take it for successive generations.

The various Tamil caste names include Paraiyar, Vishwakarma, Aachari, Konar, Idaiyar, Reddiar, Udayar, Yadhavar, Iyengar, Iyer, Pillai, Mudaliar, Thevar, Nadar, Chettiar, Gounder, Naicker, Vanniyar etc. The naming is therefore done in the fashion: Sunitha Ram Kumar Pillai. And hence they are known to only use initials besides their name except for when caste names are given more preference by certain families rather than the family name itself.

 Telugu 

Telugu people have a different naming style from the rest of India. The family name is a genitive case, hence stands first, which is followed by personal name. This practice of placing family name first is also seen in Chinese and Hungarians.

Thus "Family name (surname), Given name" format is contrasted from North India where family name typically appears last or other parts of South India where family names are little used. This might cause confusion to varying degree within India and rest of the world.

Occasionally, caste name is also suffixed at the end. For example, Neelam Sanjiva Reddy, where Neelam is the family name, Sanjiva is the given name, and Reddy is the caste name.

Occasionally, some Telugu names may follow a slightly different convention where two personal names are given along with a family name. In the name, Amara Vishnu Dev, Amara is the family name and Vishnu Dev are the given names. 

Muslims however have family names expressed at the end of their names.

 Personal names 
Telugu people are often named after Hindu gods or goddesses.

 Family names 
Nearly all Telugus possess family names called "Inti peru", which are the most unique of all the linguistic groups in India.

Telugu family names are often named after a place. For example, Pasupaleti after Pasupaleru, Kondaveeti after Kondaveedu, Kandukuri after Kandukur, etc. Unlike western names in which the family name is more well known than the personal name, among the Telugu given names are how people are most widely known.

Telugu family names are often abbreviated and written, e.g., P. V. Narasimha Rao, D. Ramanaidu, etc., unlike  western names where given name is abbreviated.

 Indexing 
According to The Chicago Manual of Style, Indian names are usually indexed by the family name, with the family name separated from the other names by a comma, but indexing may differ according to the local usage and the preferences of the individual.

 Global Indian influence in names 

See Indosphere, Sanskritisation, Indianization of Southeast Asia as well as Influence of Indian honorifics in Southeast Asia, influenced the Malay/Indonesian, Thai, and Filipino honorifics.

 See also 
 Indian honorifics
 Place names in India
 Surnames by country

 References 

 Further reading 
Kaushik, Devendra Kumar (2000) Cataloguing of Indic Names in AACR-2 ''. Delhi: Originals. 

 

Names by culture
Hindu given names